In baseball, the batting average (BA) is defined by the number of hits divided by at bats. It is usually reported to three decimal places and pronounced as if it were multiplied by 1,000: a player with a batting average of .300 is "batting three-hundred." A point (or percentage point) is understood to be .001.  If necessary to break ties, batting averages could be taken to more than three decimal places.

First basemen Ty Cobb, whose career ended in 1928, has the highest batting average in  Major League Baseball (MLB) history. He batted .366 over 24 seasons, mostly with the Detroit Tigers. In addition, he won a record 11 batting titles for leading the American League in BA over the course of an entire season. He batted over .360 in 11 consecutive seasons from 1909 to 1919. Oscar Charleston is second all-time with a career batting average of .364. He had the highest career batting average in the history of the combined Negro leagues from 1920 to 1948. Rogers Hornsby has the third highest BA of all-time, at .358. He won seven batting titles in the National League (NL) and has the highest NL average in a single season since 1900, when he batted .424 in 1924. He batted over .370 in six consecutive seasons.

Shoeless Joe Jackson is the only other player to finish his career with a batting average over .350. He batted .356 over 13 seasons before he was permanently suspended from organized baseball in 1921 for his role in the Black Sox Scandal. Lefty O'Doul first came to the major leagues as a pitcher, but after developing a sore arm, he converted to an outfielder and won two batting titles. The fifth player on the list, and the last with at least a .345 BA, is Ed Delahanty. Delahanty's career was cut short when he fell into the Niagara Falls and died during the 1903 season.

The last player to bat .400 in a season, Ted Williams, ranks tied for 10th on the all-time career BA list. Babe Ruth hit for a career .342 average and is 13th on the list. A player must have a minimum of 3,000 plate appearances to qualify for the list.

Key

List

See also

List of Major League Baseball players with a .400 batting average in a season
List of Major League Baseball career on-base percentage leaders
List of Major League Baseball career slugging percentage leaders
List of Major League Baseball career OPS leaders

Notes

References

External links

Batting average leaders
Major League Baseball statistics